Nasty Nick may refer to:

Nick Bateman, a contestant in Big Brother.
Nick Cotton, a character in EastEnders